John Cockrill (c. 1740 - ?) was a Welsh-born American planter and politician. He served as a member of the House of Burgesses.

Early life
Cockrill was born circa 1740. He was of Scottish descent. He emigrated to the United States with Major General Edward Braddock.

Career
Cockrill served in the French and Indian War of 1754-1763. He subsequently became a large planter in Richmond County, Virginia and/or Wythe County, Virginia.

Cockrill served as a member of the House of Burgesses.

Personal life and legacy
Cockrill was married twice. He had a son, Simon, from his first marriage. His second wife was Barbara Fox; their son, also called John Cockrill, was a settler in modern-day Nashville, Tennessee.

References

1740s births
Welsh people of Scottish descent
American people of Scottish descent
Welsh emigrants to the United States
American planters
House of Burgesses members
Year of death missing